"Toyang" is a song by Filipino rock band Eraserheads, from their debut album UltraElectroMagneticPop!. It is the band's second hit single.

The song is notable for featuring creative wordplay and idiosyncratic combinations: the narrator is speaking of his love for simplicity and for Toyang, a bright-eyed Filipina, through a classic English love song, several Filipino folk songs, and Ilocano poetry. It references the Paul McCartney-penned "Silly Love Songs", the first two lines of the song as well as the pun on Toyang's name is from "Too Young" (a composition written by Sylvia Dee and Sidney Lippman which was well known for Nat King Cole's rendition), and it takes inspiration from Filipino folk songs such as "Pen Pen de Sarapen", a popular rhyming song used in children's games, and "Bahay Kubo" (Nipa Hut).

Eraserheads songs
1993 songs
1993 singles
Songs written by Ely Buendia